Valeri Eduardovich Makiyev (born 16 June 1985) is a Russian former professional footballer who played as a midfielder.

Club career
He played two seasons in the Russian Football National League for FC Nosta Novotroitsk and FC Torpedo Vladimir.

External links
 
 

1985 births
People from Mozdoksky District
Living people
Russian footballers
Association football midfielders
FC SKVICH Minsk players
FC Chernomorets Novorossiysk players
FC Spartak Vladikavkaz players
FK Banga Gargždai players
FC Spartak Kostroma players
A Lyga players
Russian expatriate footballers
Expatriate footballers in Belarus
Expatriate footballers in Lithuania
FC Torpedo Vladimir players
FC Nosta Novotroitsk players
Sportspeople from North Ossetia–Alania